Edwin Muir CBE (15 May 1887 – 3 January 1959) was a Scottish poet, novelist and translator. Born on a farm in Deerness, a parish of Orkney, Scotland, he is remembered for his deeply felt and vivid poetry written in plain language and with few stylistic preoccupations.

Biography
Muir was born at the farm of Folly in Deerness, the same parish in which his mother was born. The family then moved to the island of Wyre, followed by a return to the Mainland, Orkney. In 1901, when he was 14, his father lost his farm, and the family moved to Glasgow. In quick succession his father, two brothers, and his mother died within the space of a few years. His life as a young man was a depressing experience, and involved a raft of unpleasant jobs in factories and offices, including working in a factory that turned bones into charcoal. "He suffered psychologically in a most destructive way, although perhaps the poet of later years benefitted from these experiences as much as from his Orkney 'Eden'."

In 1919, Muir married Willa Anderson, and the couple moved to London. About this, Muir wrote simply 'My marriage was the most fortunate event in my life'. Willa and her new husband worked together on many translations. Notable among them were their translation of works by Franz Kafka. They had translated The Castle within six years of Kafka's death. Willa was the more able linguist and she was the major contributor. Willa recorded in her journal that "It was ME" and that Edwin "only helped". Between 1924 and the start of the Second World War her (their) translation financed their life together. He would help her translate highly acclaimed English translations of Franz Kafka, Gerhart Hauptmann, Sholem Asch, Heinrich Mann, and Hermann Broch.

Between 1921 and 1923, Muir lived in Prague, Dresden, Italy, Salzburg and Vienna; he returned to the UK in 1924. Between 1925 and 1956, Muir published seven volumes of poetry which were collected after his death and published in 1991 as The Complete Poems of Edwin Muir. From 1927 to 1932 he published three novels, and in 1935 he came to St Andrews, where he produced his controversial Scott and Scotland (1936). In 1939 in St Andrews, Muir had a religious experience and from then onwards thought of himself as Christian, seeing Christianity as being as revolutionary as socialism. From 1946 to 1949 he was Director of the British Council in Prague and Rome. 1950 saw his appointment as Warden of Newbattle Abbey College (a college for working-class men) in Midlothian, where he met fellow Orcadian poet, George Mackay Brown. In 1955 he was made Norton Professor of English at Harvard University. He returned to Britain in 1956 but died in 1959 at Swaffham Prior, Cambridgeshire, and was buried there.

A memorial bench was erected in 1962 to Muir in the idyllic village of Swanston, Edinburgh, where he spent time during the 1950s. His wife wrote a memoir of their life together in 1967. She lived for another eleven years and died on the Isle of Bute.

Work
His childhood in remote and unspoiled Orkney represented an idyllic Eden to Muir, while his family's move to the city corresponded in his mind to a deeply disturbing encounter with the "fallen" world. Muir came to regard his family's movement from Orkney to Glasgow as a movement from Eden to Hell. The emotional tensions of that dichotomy shaped much of his work and deeply influenced his life. The following quotation expresses the basic existential dilemma of Edwin Muir's life:

"I was born before the Industrial Revolution, and am now about two hundred years old. But I have skipped a hundred and fifty of them. I was really born in 1737, and till I was fourteen no time-accidents happened to me. Then in 1751 I set out from Orkney for Glasgow. When I arrived I found that it was not 1751, but 1901, and that a hundred and fifty years had been burned
 up in my two-days' journey. But I myself was still in 1751, and remained there for a long time. All my life since I have been trying to overhaul that invisible leeway. No wonder I am obsessed with Time."  (Extract from Diary 1937–39.)

His psychological distress led him to undergo Jungian analysis in London. A vision in which he witnessed the creation strengthened the Edenic myth in his mind, leading him to see his life and career as the working-out of an archetypal fable. In his Autobiography he wrote, "the life of every man is an endlessly repeated performance of the life of man...". He also expressed his feeling that our deeds on Earth constitute "a myth which we act almost without knowing it". Alienation, paradox, the existential dyads of good and evil, life and death, love and hate, and images of journeys and labyrinths are key elements in his work.

His Scott and Scotland advanced the claim that Scotland can create a national literature only by writing in English, an opinion that placed him in direct opposition to the Lallans movement of Hugh MacDiarmid. He had little sympathy for Scottish nationalism.

His wife, Willa Muir, translated the works of many German authors, including Franz Kafka. These were issued under their joint names, but his wife notes that he "only helped".

In 1958, Edwin and Willa were granted the first Johann-Heinrich-Voss Translation Award. Many of their translations of German novels are still in print.

In 1965 a volume of his selected poetry was edited and introduced by T. S. Eliot.

Legacy
In an appreciation of Muir's poetry in Texas Quarterly, the critic Kathleen Raine wrote in 1961: "Time does not fade [Muir's poems], and it becomes clear that their excellence owes nothing to the accidental circumstances of the moment at which the poet wrote, or we read, his poems; they survive, as it were, a change of background, and we begin to see that whereas the 'new' movements of this or that decade lose their significance when the scene changes and retain only a historical interest, Edwin Muir, a poet who never followed fashion, has in fact given more permanent expression to his world than other poets who deliberately set out to be the mouth-pieces of their generation."

Similarly, Joseph H. Summers, in a retrospective assessment in the Massachusetts Review, called Muir's achievement in poetry and prose "larger than the merely literary. He did not share in the modern attempts to deify poetry, or language, or even the human imagination. Implicit in all of his works is the recognition that there are things more important than literature—life and love, the physical world, the individual spirit within its body: those things in which the religious man recognizes the immediate work of God. Muir's triumph was less in the technological realm of communication than in the vastly more difficult realm of sensitivity, perception, wisdom, the things which he communicated. It was a triumph made possible only, in the familiar paradox, by humility."

Works
We Moderns: Enigmas and Guesses,  under the pseudonym Edward Moore, London, George Allen & Unwin, 1918
Latitudes, New York, B. W. Huebsch, 1924
First Poems, London, Hogarth Press, 192
Chorus of the Newly Dead, London, Hogarth Press, 1926
Transition: Essays on Contemporary Literature, London, Hogarth Press, 1926
The Marionette, London, Hogarth Press, 1927
The Structure of the Novel, London, Hogarth Press, 1928
John Knox: Portrait of a Calvinist, London, Jonathan Cape, 1929
The Three Brothers, London, Heinemann, 1931
Poor Tom, London, J. M. Dent & Sons, 1932
Variations on a Time Theme, London, J. M. Dent & Sons, 1934
Scottish Journey London, Heinemann in association with Victor Gollancz, 1935
Journeys and Places, London, J. M. Dent & Sons, 1937
The Present Age from 1914, London, Cresset Press, 1939
The Story and the Fable: An Autobiography, London, Harrap, 1940
The Narrow Place, London, Faber, 1943
The Scots and Their Country, London, published for the British Council by Longman,  1946
The Voyage, and Other Poems, London, Faber, 1946
Essays on Literature and Society, London, Hogarth Press, 1949
The Labyrinth, London, Faber, 1949
Collected Poems, 1921–1951, London, Faber, 1952
An Autobiography, London : Hogarth Press, 1954
Prometheus, illustrated by John Piper, London, Faber, 1954
One Foot in Eden, New York, Grove Press, 1956
New Poets, 1959 (edited), London, Eyre & Spottiswoode, 1959
The Estate of Poetry, Cambridge, MA, Harvard University Press, 1962
Collected Poems, London and New York, Oxford University Press, 1965
The Politics of King Lear, New York, Haskell House, 1970

Translations by Willa and Edwin Muir
Power by Lion Feuchtwanger, New York, Viking Press, 1926
The Ugly Duchess: A Historical Romance by Lion Feuchtwanger, London, Martin Secker, 1927
Two Anglo-Saxon Plays: The Oil Islands and Warren Hastings, by Lion Feuchtwanger, London, Martin Secker, 1929
Success: A Novel by Lion Feuchtwanger, New York, Viking Press, 1930
The Castle by Franz Kafka, London, Martin Secker, 1930
The Sleepwalkers: A Trilogy by Hermann Broch, Boston, MA, Little, Brown & Company, 1932
Josephus by Lion Feuchtwanger, New York, Viking Press, 1932
Salvation by Sholem Asch, New York, G.P. Putnam's Sons, 1934
The Hill of Lies by Heinrich Mann, London, Jarrolds, 1934
Mottke, the Thief by Sholem Asch, New York, G.P. Putnam's Sons, 1935
The Unknown Quantity by Hermann Broch, New York, Viking Press, 1935
The Jew of Rome: A Historical Romance by Lion Feuchtwanger, London, Hutchinson, 1935
The Loom of Justice by Ernst Lothar, New York, G.P. Putnam's Sons, 1935
Night over the East by Erik von Kuehnelt-Leddihn, London, Sheed & Ward, 1936
The Pretender by Lion Feuchtwanger, New York, The Viking Press, 1937
Amerika by Franz Kafka, New York, Doubleday/New Directions, 1946
The Trial by Franz Kafka, London, Martin Secker, 1937, reissued New York, The Modern Library, 1957
Metamorphosis and Other Stories by Franz Kafka, Harmondsworth, Penguin Books, 1961.

References

Further reading
 Gifford, Douglas (1982), In Search of the Scottish Renaissance: The Reprinting of Scottish Fiction, in Cencrastus No. 9, Summer 1982, pp. 26 – 30, 
 Hearn, Sheila G. (1981), Muir: The Myth of the Man, review of Edwin Muir, An Autobiography; Roger Knight, Edwin Muir: An Introduction to his Work; & Akros No. 47, August 1981, in Murray, Glen (ed.), Cencrastus No. 7, Winter 1981–82, pp. 46 & 47, 
Hearn, Sheila G. (1982), Edwin Muir's "Scottish" Criticism, which includes reviews of Edwin Muir: Uncollected Scottish Criticism by Andrew Noble and Poor Tom by Edwin Muir, in Cencrastus No. 9, Summer 1982, pp. 41 & 42, 
 Hearn, Sheila G. (1983), Tradition and the Individual Scot: Edwin Muir & T.S. Eliot, in Cencrastus No. 13, Summer 1983, pp. 21 - 24,

External links

 
 

Edwin Muir's grave

1887 births
1959 deaths
20th-century Scottish poets
20th-century Scottish novelists
Writers from Orkney
Harvard University faculty
Scottish translators
German–English translators
Scottish Renaissance
Translators of Franz Kafka
20th-century British translators